Two-time defending champion Roger Federer defeated Andy Roddick in the final, 6–2, 4–6, 7–5, 6–1 to win the men's singles tennis title at the 2006 US Open. It was his third US Open title and his ninth major title overall. Federer became the sixth man (after Jack Crawford, Don Budge, Frank Sedgman, Lew Hoad and Rod Laver) to reach all four major finals in one calendar year, the second to do so in the Open Era, and the first to do so since Laver in 1969. Also, he reached a record-equalling 10th consecutive major semifinal (streak starting at the 2004 Wimbledon Championships), after Laver and Ivan Lendl.

This tournament marked eight-time major champion Andre Agassi's last professional appearance. He played his last match against Benjamin Becker. Future champion Juan Martín del Potro made his first appearance in the main draw of the US Open, losing to Alejandro Falla in the first round. This was also the first major in which future world No. 1s Novak Djokovic and Andy Murray were seeded, at 20th and 17th, respectively.

Seeds
The seeded players are listed below. Players are listed with the round in which they exited.

Qualifying draw

Draw

Finals

Top half

Section 1

Section 2

Section 3

Section 4

Bottom half

Section 5

Section 6

Section 7

Section 8

External links
 Association of Tennis Professionals (ATP) – 2006 US Open Men's Singles draw
2006 US Open – Men's draws and results at the International Tennis Federation

Men's Singles
US Open (tennis) by year – Men's singles